Cavan County Council is the authority responsible for local government in County Cavan, Ireland. As a county council, it is governed by the Local Government Act 2001. The council is responsible for housing and community, roads and transportation, urban planning and development, amenity and culture, and environment. The council has 18 elected members. Elections are held every five years and are by single transferable vote. The head of the council has the title of Cathaoirleach (Chairperson). The county administration is headed by a Chief Executive, Tommy Ryan. The county town is Cavan.

History
The meeting place of Cavan County Council has always been at Cavan Courthouse.

Local Electoral Areas and Municipal Districts
Cavan County Council is divided into the following municipal districts and local electoral areas, defined by electoral divisions.

Current councillors
The following were elected at the 2019 Cavan County Council election.

Councillors by electoral area 

Notes

Changes in affiliation

References

External links

Politics of County Cavan
County councils in the Republic of Ireland